Interstate 471 (I-471) is a  Interstate Highway, linking I-71 in Downtown Cincinnati, Ohio, to I-275 in Highland Heights, Kentucky. South of I-275, the expressway continues south to U.S. Route 27 (US 27) as unsigned Kentucky Route 471 (KY 471).

Route description

The southern terminus of I-471 is at an interchange with I–275 and US 27. I-471 heads northwest, then turns northeast, having an interchange with US 27 in Southgate. After US 27, I-471 turns back northwest, heading toward Cincinnati. On the way to Cincinnati, I-471 passes through the east side of Newport. On the east side of Newport, I-471 has an interchange with KY 8. I-471 crosses the Ohio River using the Daniel Carter Beard Bridge, a Cincinnati landmark. After the Ohio River crossing, I-471 has an interchange with US 50. After the interchange with US 50, I-471 has an interchange with I-71 northeast of Downtown Cincinnati. The northern terminus of I-471 is at the interchange with I-71.

History
I-471 was first envisioned in 1961 as an east–west connector between I-71/I-75 in Covington, Kentucky, with I-71 in Cincinnati, Ohio, crossing the Ohio River at a spot close to the current location. In effect, this connection would have provided for an alternative to I-71, creating an inner loop system that would span both Ohio and Kentucky. Since this freeway would have hugged the southern riverfront, I-471 would have prevented access to the Ohio River from Kentucky.

By 1967, the freeway was planned for a new alignment, much like the one seen today, connecting Cincinnati, Ohio, with Newport, Kentucky. On December 10, 1967, plans called for a north–south,  freeway that would connect I-71 with I-275 near the interchange with US 27. I-471 would have three lanes in each direction (which has since been reworked into four lanes in each direction due to a construction project).

The bridge between Newport and Cincinnati was constructed between November 1971 and September 1976 and named after Covington native Daniel Carter Beard, the founder of the Boy Scouts of America. It developed the nickname of the "Big Mac Bridge" because its massive yellow arches over the river resemble the golden arches of McDonald's restaurants. The Daniel Carter Beard Bridge was fully dedicated in 1981.

Subsequent construction extended the freeway south from the bridge in phases, with the last segment of I-471 opening in 1980 at its junction with US 27 south of I-275. In 1981, the cost to construct the freeway and bridge was calculated to be $85 million (equivalent to $ in ).

Exit list

References

External links

 I-471 on Cincinnati-Transit.net
 KentuckyRoads.com: I-471

Auxiliary Interstate Highways
Interstate Highways in Ohio
Interstate Highways in Kentucky
Roads in Cincinnati
4
Transportation in Campbell County, Kentucky
Transportation in Hamilton County, Ohio